Gustavus (Lingít: Wanachích T’aak Héen) is a second-class city in Hoonah-Angoon Census Area in the U.S. state of Alaska. The 2020 census population was 655, which represents a 48% increase over the 2010 census of 442 and is one of the fastest growing communities in Alaska.

History
Gustavus, formerly known as "Strawberry Point", lies on the outwash plain created by the glaciers that once filled Glacier Bay. Two hundred years ago, it was primarily a single large "beach". The native Tlingit people and others used the area for fishing, berry picking, and other similar uses. The town itself is less than one hundred years old. The first settlers arrived in 1914, but left shortly afterward. The first permanent homestead was established in 1917, when Abraham Lincoln Parker moved his family to Strawberry Point. Many Gustavus residents are descendants and relatives of the original Parker homesteaders.

In 1925 the name became "Gustavus", when the U.S. Post Office required a change for its new post office, although locals continued calling it "Strawberry Point" long afterwards. The new name came from Point Gustavus at the mouth of Glacier Bay.

In 1793 George Vancouver named Point Adolphus (at the northern tip of Chichagof Island, and today a well-known humpback whale feeding area) after Adolphus Frederick, seventh son of King George III. In 1878, W.H. Dall, while working on a coastal survey, saw "Adolphus" on the map and assumed it was for Swedish king Gustavus Adolphus. The point across Icy Strait from Point Adolphus at the mouth of Glacier Bay was not named on the map, so Dall called it "Gustavus". Another possibility is that Dall named Gustavus for Gustavus C. Hanus, a U.S. Naval Academy graduate who had extensive experience throughout southeast Alaska, and both Dall and Hanus served with the Coast Survey in Alaska. Hanus laid out the first streets in Juneau and helped quell the trouble in Klukwan in 1881.

There is still a large beach at Gustavus, with many strawberries. The city is surrounded on three sides by Glacier Bay National Park and Preserve, and on the fourth side by water. Gustavus's coastal location gives it a relatively mild winter.

Geography
Gustavus is located at  (58.416327, -135.745549).

Gustavus is split by the Salmon River, a small waterway crossed by a bridge for the paved road running out to Glacier Bay National Park. Coho salmon, Dolly Varden, and other fish are commonly caught in this river. Within the city limits, the river is affected by tides.

Climate
Gustavus has a wet, maritime subarctic climate (Köppen Dfc) with short, mild summers and long, cold winters.

Demographics

Gustavus first appeared on the 1940 U.S. Census as "Strawberry Point", an unincorporated village. In 1950, it returned as Gustavus. It was made a census-designated place (CDP) in 1980. Its status was changed to an incorporated city in 2004.

As of the census of 2000, there were 429 people, 199 households, and 114 families residing in the city. The population density was 11.4 per square mile (4.4/km2). There were 345 housing units at an average density of 9.2 per square mile (3.5/km2). The racial makeup of the city was 89% white, 0% Black or African American, 4% Native American, 0.2% Asian, 0.2% Pacific Islander, 2% from other races, and 4% from two or more races. 1.4% of the population were Hispanic or Latino of any race.

Of the 199 households, 28% had children under the age of 18 living with them, 47% were married couples living together, 6% had a female householder with no husband present, and 43% were non-families. 38% of all households were made up of individuals, and 6% had someone living alone who was 65 years of age or older. The average household size was 2.2 and the average family size was 2.9.

In the city, the population was spread out, with 26% under the age of 18, 3% from 18 to 24, 30% from 25 to 44, 36% from 45 to 64, and 5% who were 65 years of age or older. The median age was 40 years. For every 100 females, there were 130 males. For every 100 females age 18 and over, there were 135 males.

The median income for a household in the CDP was $34,800, and the median income for a family was $51,800. Males had a median income of $41,800 versus $29,400 for females. The per capita income for the city was $21,100. 15% of the population and 10% of families were below the poverty line. 13% of those under the age of 18 and 14% of those 65 and older were living below the poverty line.

Economy
The Gustavus economy is strongly linked to the surrounding natural resources; tourism and commercial fishing are mainstays. However, the importance of commercial fishing is in decline, as the Dungeness crab fishery in Glacier Bay National Park was closed in the early 2000s and the fishing for Dungeness outside of the national park has become poor. Salmon and halibut remain as the primary catch of the commercial fishing done out of Gustavus. Those not involved in tourism or seafood typically work for the government at the public school, the post office, the National Park Service, or the City of Gustavus.

The hardware and grocery store is called ToshCo, named after its owner and the fact that most of its inventory is from the Costco in Juneau.

Transportation
Gustavus is not connected to the contiguous highway system. Gustavus Airport and the Alaska Marine Highway provide access between Gustavus and the outside world. During the 2020 coronavirus pandemic, the ferry system shut down and Gustavus became even more isolated, relying on private boats for grocery shipments.

References

External links

 City of Gustavus official website
 Gustavus Visitor's Association
 Gustavus Historical Archives & Antiquities

1917 establishments in Alaska
Cities in Alaska
Cities in Hoonah–Angoon Census Area, Alaska
Glacier Bay National Park and Preserve
Populated coastal places in Alaska on the Pacific Ocean
Populated places established in 1917